Tangelene Bolton (b.1991–) is an American film, TV, and video game composer and music producer.

Early life 

The daughter of an Irish, English, and Scottish father and a Filipino mother, Bolton was born in Upland, California, but grew up in Flemington, New Jersey.
She started piano lessons at two years old, and as she got older, her passion turned to filmmaking. Bolton attended the Berklee College of Music (2013) where she received her Bachelor of Music in Film Scoring. After graduation, she moved to Los Angeles and started interning at Hans Zimmer’s studio, Remote Control Productions, where she was hired. Currently, she works as a freelance composer for film, TV, commercials, and video games. In addition, she has experience as a music producer and conductor.

Career 

Her career was launched at Remote Control Productions, where she worked for Hans Zimmer (The Lion King, Gladiator, The Dark Knight, Inception, Interstellar) and Henry Jackman (X-Men, Captain Phillips, Captain America, Big Hero 6). Bolton credits Bobby Tahouri as a mentor. She credits him with teaching her how to compose music quickly, remember to be authentic, and to treat others well. Bolton has provided technical music support and/or music for: Rise of the Tomb Raider (Playstation), Girlfriend’s Day (Netflix), Altitude (Lionsgate), No Escape Room (SYFY), Shimmer and Shine (Nickelodeon), 60 Days In (A&E).

In 2017 and 2018, Bolton was invited to conduct her pieces at the Future is Female concerts performed by the Hollywood Chamber Orchestra. Singer and composer Tori Letzler organized the concerts in order to feature the many women who are often overlooked in the film and television music industry.
This inaugural 2017 concert featured ten new works by female composers at the Moss Theater at the New Roads School in Santa Monica, CA.
In 2017, Bolton conducted her composition, “Divertimento,” and in 2018, Bolton conducted her composition, “You and I.”

In 2020, Bolton composed music for the Walt Disney animated short film, “Just a Thought” with director, Brian Menz.
In July 2020, she was chosen to work with animated shorts filmmakers at the Sundance Institute new initiative to support Music for Animated Shorts.

Musical style 

Bolton strives to build thematic material that weaves in and out of the story, creating music that not only enhances the pivotal moments, but also is retained in the listeners’ subconscious.
Her influences are a mixture of classical piano music such as Debussy and Chopin, movie music from classic films and Disney, and contemporary music and synth techniques.

References

External links 

American women composers
American film score composers
Berklee College of Music alumni
Living people
1991 births
Asian American music
21st-century American women